Nancy in London is the third studio album by Nancy Sinatra, released on Reprise Records in 1966. Arranged and conducted by Billy Strange, the album was produced by Lee Hazlewood. It peaked at number 122 on the Billboard 200 chart.

Track listing

Charts

References

External links
 
 

1966 albums
Nancy Sinatra albums
Albums arranged by Billy Strange
Albums conducted by Billy Strange
Albums produced by Lee Hazlewood
Reprise Records albums
Sundazed Records albums